Oslo Court is a block of flats on Prince Albert Road in St John's Wood, London. Built around 1937, it was designed by architect Robert Atkinson in the International Modern style and is Grade II listed.

Oslo Court Restaurant 
The ground floor of the building is Oslo Court Restaurant. It is known for serving traditional food rooted in 1970s and 1980s French-British cuisine. Although not a kosher restaurant it is traditionally popular with the London Jewish community. A 2021 survey of reviews rated its Egyptian-born waiter Neil Heshmat, who had worked at the restaurant since 1976, as the most popular waiter in the country, noting that he had personally been praised by 13 reviews in national newspapers since 2006. The restaurant and Heshmat's service was also selected as a luxury by Matt Lucas on Desert Island Discs.

References

External links
 Restaurant website
Grade II listed buildings in the City of Westminster
Apartment buildings in London
European restaurants in London